Victor Lazarenko (born in Juauary 1, 1957) is a retired Soviet football player and Ukrainian coach. He spend most of his career to Desna Chernihiv the main club in Chernihiv.

Career
Victor Lazarenko, started his career in the reserve squad of Dynamo Kyiv. In 1977 he moved to Desna Chernihiv, where on his first season (1977) got 14th in the Soviet Second League Zone 2.

In 1981, he moved to Zirka Kropyvnytskyi, where he stayed for two seasons.

In 1984, he moved to Tekstylnyk Chernihiv, where he won the Chernihiv Oblast Football Cup. In 1985, he moved to Khimik Chernihiv, where he won the Chernihiv Oblast Football Championship.

In 1986, he returned to Desna Chernihiv, where he stayed for two season. In 2013 he was appointed as coach of Yunist Chernihiv.

In 2015, he played with Andriy Yarmolenko and Berezenko for the Chernihiv team in honor of the opening of a new football field the Stadium Yunist. In a recently interview he spoke about his experience to play with a start like Andriy Yarmolenko.

Honours
Tekstylnyk Chernihiv
 Chernihiv Oblast Football Cup: 1984

Khimik Chernihiv
 Chernihiv Oblast Football Championship: 1985

References

External links 
Profile on website 

1957 births
Living people
Soviet footballers
Footballers from Chernihiv
FC Desna Chernihiv players
FC Khimik Chernihiv players
FC Cheksyl Chernihiv players
FC Yunist Chernihiv managers
FC Dynamo Kyiv players
FC Zirka Kropyvnytskyi players
WFC Lehenda-ShVSM Chernihiv managers
Female association football managers
Association football defenders